H. L. Bonham House is a historic house located at 408 White Top Road near Chilhowie, Smyth County, Virginia.

Description and history 
It was built in 1911 and was designed by C. B. Kearfoot Jr. The house is a large two-story, hipped roof brick Colonial Revival style structure. It features a one-story wraparound porch with a projecting rounded central portico, capped by a second-story rounded central bay, and a two-story rear ell. Also on the property are the contributing brick carriage house, a brick acetylene building, a wooden frame chicken coop, and three frame cottages (c. 1910).

It was listed on the National Register of Historic Places on May 11, 2000.

References

Houses on the National Register of Historic Places in Virginia
Colonial Revival architecture in Virginia
Houses completed in 1911
Houses in Smyth County, Virginia
National Register of Historic Places in Smyth County, Virginia